Todd Coolman (born July 14, 1954) is a jazz bassist and a retired tenured Professor of Music at the Jazz Studies Program in the Conservatory of Music at Purchase College in Westchester County, New York. He is also the former Artistic Director of the Skidmore Jazz Institute.

Coolman grew up in Gary, Indiana. In 1978 he moved to New York City. He has since then performed with Horace Silver, Gerry Mulligan, Art Farmer, Lionel Hampton, Benny Goodman, Slide Hampton, Stan Getz, Tommy Flanagan, and countless others. He is probably best known for his 26-year association with the James Moody Quartet. Coolman has recorded with numerous jazz musicians in many contexts and has also released four recordings under his own leadership: Tomorrows (1990), Lexicon (1995), Perfect Strangers (2008) and Collectables (2016). In 1999, Coolman won the Grammy Award for Best Album Notes for Miles Davis Quintet 1965-1968. In 2011 an album on which he played, James Moody's Moody 4B, won the Grammy Award for Best Jazz Instrumental Album, Individual or Group.

He has written two method books related to jazz bass playing: The Bass Tradition and The Bottom Line.

In 1997, Coolman received a Ph.D. in Music and the Performing Arts from New York University.

He lives in Denville, New Jersey.

Discography

As leader
 Tomorrows (BRC, 1990)
 Lexicon (Double-Time, 1995)
 Perfect Strangers (ArtistShare, 2008)
 Collectables (Sunnyside, 2016)

As sideman
 With James Moody
 Moving Forward (1988)
 Sweet and Lovely (1989)
 Young at Heart (1996)
 Moody Plays Mancini (1997)
 Homage (2004)
 Our Delight (2008)
 Moody 4A (2009)
 Moody 4B (2010)

 With Michael Dease
 Bonafide (2018)

 With Hal Galper Trio
 Invitation to a Concert (1990)
 Live at Port Townsend '91 (1991)

 With David "Fathead" Newman
 Blue Head (Candid, 1990) with Clifford Jordan

 With Rob Schneiderman
 Radio Waves (1991)
 Glass Enclosure (2008)

 With Gerald Wilson
 Monterey Moods (2007)
 Detroit (2009)

 With others
 Made in Japan, Lionel Hampton (1982)
 Advance, Bobby Watson (1984)
 Chicago Fire, Terry Gibbs (1987)
 After Hours, John Campbell (1988)
 Holiday for Swing, Buddy DeFranco/Terry Gibbs (1988)
 Live in Paris '92, Ahmad Jamal (1993)
 Sincerely, George & Ira Gershwin (1997)
 Gone with the Wind, Buddy DeFranco (1999)

References

External links
Official Website

Living people
Grammy Award winners
American jazz double-bassists
Male double-bassists
1954 births
Steinhardt School of Culture, Education, and Human Development alumni
People from Denville, New Jersey
Musicians from Gary, Indiana
State University of New York at Purchase faculty
Jazz musicians from New York (state)
21st-century double-bassists
21st-century American male musicians
American male jazz musicians
Double-Time Records artists
Sunnyside Records artists
ArtistShare artists